Frane Vitaić (born 7 June 1982) is a Croatian retired footballer.

Club career

Early years
Vitaić went to the Hajduk and NK Mosor youth schools, but never got to play for the Hajduk senior team.

Vitaić previously played for NK Osijek, HNK Šibenik and HNK Cibalia in the Croatian First Football League and for RNK Split and Cibalia in the Croatian Second Football League.

Vitaić was the top scorer of the 2015–16 Croatian Second Football League with 15 goals to his account.

Personaal life
His brother Ante Vitaić is also a football player.

Honours
RNK Split
Croatian Second Football League: 2009–10
Cibalia
Croatian Second Football League: 2015–16

References

External links
 

1984 births
Living people
Footballers from Split, Croatia
Croatian twins
Twin sportspeople
Association football midfielders
Croatian footballers
HNK Hajduk Split players
NK Mosor players
NK Osijek players
HNK Šibenik players
ASC Oțelul Galați players
RNK Split players
HNK Cibalia players
Croatian Football League players
First Football League (Croatia) players
Liga I players
Croatian expatriate footballers
Expatriate footballers in Romania
Croatian expatriate sportspeople in Romania